Andrew Jason Ashby (born July 11, 1967) is an American former professional baseball starting pitcher, who played for the Philadelphia Phillies, Colorado Rockies, San Diego Padres, Atlanta Braves, and Los Angeles Dodgers of Major League Baseball. Listed at 6' 1", 180 lb., Ashby batted and threw right-handed. He was born in Kansas City, Missouri. Andy is the uncle to professional player Aaron Ashby.

Career
Ashby attended Park Hill High School in Kansas City and played baseball with the Crowder Roughriders at Crowder College.

On June 15, 1991, Ashby threw an immaculate inning, striking out all three batters on nine total pitches, in the fourth inning of a 3–1 loss to the Cincinnati Reds; he became the 15th National League pitcher and the 24th pitcher in major-league history to accomplish the feat.

Ashby was acquired by the Colorado Rockies in the 1993 expansion draft, but after compiling an 0–4 record with an 8.50 ERA, he was dealt to the San Diego Padres at the end of the season. One highlight of Ashby's tenure with the Rockies occurred when he notched his one and only career save on May 25, 1993, against the Astros. Ashby went one inning to preserve a 7-5 Rockies victory.

Despite injuries to his shoulder, elbow and back, Ashby saw the greatest success of his career with the Padres. He was also a member of the 1998 and 1999 National League All-Star team. In eight seasons with the Padres, Ashby compiled a 70–62 record with a 3.59 ERA.

Ashby returned to the Phillies when he was traded from the Padres for Adam Eaton, Carlton Loewer and Steve Montgomery on November 10, 1999. The transaction was a cost-cutting measure by the Padres. Ashby had been touted as a potential ace for the struggling Phillies pitching staff. However, he pitched poorly, going 4–7 with a 5.68 ERA. He was sent to the Atlanta Braves midseason, where he helped the team reach the playoffs with an 8–6 record and a 4.13 ERA.

Ashby spent the next three years with the Los Angeles Dodgers, going 14–23 while posting a 4.31 ERA.

In a 14-season career, Ashby posted a 98–110 record with 1173 strikeouts and a 4.12 ERA in 1810 innings pitched.

Since 2013, Ashby has done work as a TV Analyst for Bally Sports San Diego on Padres games. He and his family have homes in San Diego and Pennsylvania.

Personal life 
Ashby is married with four daughters.

Ashby's nephew, Aaron, is a pitcher with the Milwaukee Brewers.

References

External links

Andy Ashby at Pura Pelota (Venezuela Professional Baseball League)

1967 births
Living people
Atlanta Braves players
Baseball players from Kansas City, Missouri
Batavia Clippers players
Bend Phillies players
Clearwater Phillies players
Colorado Rockies players
Colorado Springs Sky Sox players
Crowder College alumni
Crowder Roughriders baseball players
Lake Elsinore Storm players
Los Angeles Dodgers players
Major League Baseball pitchers
National League All-Stars
Petroleros de Cabimas players
Philadelphia Phillies players
Portland Beavers players
Reading Phillies players
San Diego Padres players
Scranton/Wilkes-Barre Red Barons players
Spartanburg Phillies players
Utica Blue Sox players
American expatriate baseball players in Venezuela